The University of Informatic Sciences (UCI, also known as the University of Information Sciences and University of Informatics Sciences) is a Cuban university research center based in  the ward of Wajay, Boyeros municipal borough, Havana.

History
Born as a project of the Cuban Revolution called the "Future Project" which has two objectives: to computerize the country and develop the software industry to contribute to economic development the same. It is the first Cuban university to be established under the purposes of the Battle of Ideas.

Formation
The UCI has a particular curriculum among other universities in the country. Students follow the principle of linking work and study, which places an emphasis on production as part of the learning process. From the second or third year of study students can be linked to productive projects that contribute to the economy.

The university offers the following degrees 
 Engineering in Information Sciences
 Bioinformatic Engineering
 Cybersecurity Engineering

Other activities complement the training curriculum to provide space for research and innovation and the development of skills in the use of technology. The UCI has advanced computer technology and is one of the major computer centers in Cuba.

Nova
Nova is a Linux distribution being developed by students and professors at the Universidad de las Ciencias Informáticas, with the participation of members of other institutions, to support the ongoing migration to Free Software in Cuba as part of the computerization of the Cuban society.

Gallery

References

External links

 Official website
 Nova GNU/Linux official project website
 HumanOS: Free and Open Source Software Community

Educational institutions established in 2002
Universities in Cuba
Oscar Niemeyer buildings
2002 establishments in Cuba
21st-century architecture in Cuba